In the Jahriyya revolt of 1781 sectarian violence between two suborders of the Naqshbandi Sufis, the Jahriyya Sufi Muslims and their rivals, the Khafiyya Sufi Muslims, led to Qing intervention to stop the fighting between the two, which in turn led to a Jahriyya Sufi Muslim rebellion which the Qing dynasty of China crushed with the help of the Khufiyya (Khafiyya) Sufi Muslims.

Due to street fighting and lawsuits between the Jahriyya and Khufiyya Sufi orders, Ma Mingxin was arrested to stop the sectarian violence between the Sufis. The Jahriyya then tried to violently jailbreak Ma Mingxin which led to his execution and the crushing of the Jahriyya rebels. The Qing used Xinjiang as a place to put deported Jahriyya rebels. 

The Khufiyya Sufis and Gedimu joined together against the Jahriyya Sufis whom they fiercely opposed and differed from in practices. Salar Jahriyyas were among those deported to Xinjiang. Some Han Chinese joined and fought alongside the Jahriyya Salar Muslim rebels in their revolt. Muslim loyalists fought for the Qing.

Jahriyya followers were also deported to Guizhou and Yunnan. The Jahriyya were labelled as the "New Teaching".

Corruption and embezzlement by officials was suggested as a contributing factor to the violence.

The Dungan Revolt (1895–96) broke out in the same place as the Jahriyya revolt for very similar reasons, sectarian violence and lawsuits between two Naqshbandi Sufi orders which the Qing tried to resolve.

Ma Mingxin's descendant was Ma Yuanzhang.

In addition to sending Han exiles convicted of crimes to Xinjiang to be slaves of Banner garrisons there, the Qing also practiced reverse exile, exiling Inner Asian (Mongol, Russian and Muslim criminals from Mongolia and Inner Asia) to China proper where they would serve as slaves in Han Banner garrisons in Guangzhou. Russian, Oirats and Muslims (Oros. Ulet. Hoise jergi weilengge niyalma) such as Yakov and Dmitri were exiled to the Han banner garrison in Guangzhou.  In the 1780s after the Muslim rebellion in Gansu started by Zhang Wenqing 張文慶 was defeated, Muslims like Ma Jinlu 馬進祿 were exiled to the Han Banner garrison in Guangzhou to become slaves to Han Banner officers. The Qing code regulating Mongols in Mongolia sentenced Mongol criminals to exile and to become slaves to Han bannermen in Han Banner garrisons in China proper.

References

See also
 Muslim groups in China
 Dungan revolt
 Dungan Revolt (1895–96)
 List of rebellions in China
 Islam in China
 History of Islam in China
 Islam during the Qing Dynasty
 Ma Yuanzhang

18th-century rebellions
Rebellions in the Qing dynasty
1780s in China
Military history of Gansu
Military history of Qinghai
Conflicts in 1781
1781 in China
Violence against indigenous peoples